On the Town is a 1949 American Technicolor musical film with music by Leonard Bernstein and Roger Edens and book and lyrics by Betty Comden and Adolph Green. It is an adaptation of the Broadway stage musical of the same name produced in 1944 (which itself is an adaptation of the Jerome Robbins ballet entitled Fancy Free which was also produced in 1944), although many changes in script and score were made from the original stage version; for instance, most of Bernstein's score was dropped in favor of new songs by Edens, who disliked the majority of  Bernstein's music for being too complex and too operatic for film audiences.  This caused Bernstein to boycott the film.

The film was directed by Gene Kelly, who also choreographed, and Stanley Donen in their directorial debut, and stars Kelly, Frank Sinatra, Betty Garrett, and Ann Miller, and features Jules Munshin and Vera-Ellen. It was a product of the Arthur Freed unit at MGM, and is notable for its combination of studio and location filming, as a result of Gene Kelly's insistence that some scenes be shot in New York City, including at Columbus Circle, the American Museum of Natural History, the Brooklyn Bridge, and Rockefeller Center.

The film was an immediate success and won the Oscar for Best Music—Scoring of a Musical Picture, and was nominated for a Golden Globe Award for Best Cinematography (Color). Screenwriters Comden and Green won the Writers Guild of America Award for Best Written American Musical.

In 2006, the film ranked No. 19 on the American Film Institute's list of Best Musicals. In 2018, the film was selected for preservation in the United States National Film Registry by the Library of Congress as being "culturally, historically, or aesthetically significant."

Plot
Three US Navy sailors – Gabey, Chip, and Ozzie – begin their shore leave, excited for their 24 hours in New York ("New York, New York"). While riding the subway, Gabey falls in love with the picture of the monthly "Miss Turnstiles," whose name is Ivy Smith. By chance, she's in the next subway station and Gabey gets to pose in a promotional photo of her. After she catches the next train, Gabey vows to find her again. The sailors race around New York in a frenzied search, hoping to still have time to sightsee and take dates out to the clubs.

Along the way they are assisted by, and become romantically involved with, two women and pair up: Ozzie with Claire, an anthropologist; and Chip with Hildy, an aggressively amorous taxi driver. Claire claims that she's found her passionate "Prehistoric Man" in Ozzie at the Museum of Anthropological History. While dancing, Ozzie accidentally knocks over a dinosaur skeleton and the group flees the museum. They decide to split up in search of Ivy, during which Hildy invites Chip to "Come Up to My Place."

Finally locating Ivy in a dance class, Gabey takes her on an imaginary date down his home town "Main Street" in a studio in Symphonic Hall. He doesn't realize that she is from the same small town since she pretends to be a native New Yorker. Meanwhile, Chip sincerely falls for Hildy and tells her "You're Awful" – that is, awful nice to be with. During the evening, the three couples meet at the top of the Empire State Building to celebrate a night "On the Town."

The couples go to several clubs for a good time. Gabey is still convinced Ivy is a genuine celebrity, and so Hildy and Claire bribe a waiter to make a fuss in order to keep up the ruse. When an ashamed Ivy walks out on Gabey to get to her late night work as a cooch dancer, Gabey is despondent. Hildy has her annoying, but well-meaning roommate, Lucy Schmeeler fill in as Gabey's date, but he can't be consoled. The friends lift his spirits by singing "You Can Count on Me." Since Lucy has a bad cold, Gabey drops her off at her apartment and apologizes for having been a lack-luster date.

The group eventually reunites with Ivy at Coney Island. Despite her lies being revealed, Gabey doesn't care and is just happy to have found her. Unfortunately, the group has been pursued by police for the dinosaur incident. The three men are taken back to their ship and the women barely talk their way out of a night in jail. Moved by their speeches, the police escort them to the ship just as the sailors' 24-hour shore leave ends. Although their future is uncertain, each couple shares one last kiss on the pier as a new batch of sailors heads out into the city for their leave ("New York, New York" reprise).

Cast

 Gene Kelly as Gabey
 Frank Sinatra as Chip
 Betty Garrett as Brunhilde "Hildy" Esterhazy
 Ann Miller as Claire Huddesen
 Jules Munshin as Ozzie
 Vera-Ellen as Ivy Smith

 Florence Bates as Madame Dilyovska
 Alice Pearce as Lucy Shmeeler
 George Meader as Professor
 Hans Conried as François (head waiter) (uncredited)
 Murray Alper as Cab owner (uncredited)

Cast notes
 Carol Haney, Gene Kelly's assistant, performed with Kelly in the Day in New York ballet sequence, but was not credited. This was Haney's screen debut
 Mickey Miller is the skill dancer replacing the Jules Munshin Ozzie character in the “Day in New York” ballet sequence, but was not credited.
 Bea Benaderet has an uncredited cameo as a girl from Brooklyn on the subway, her film debut in a speaking role.
 Bern Hoffman has an uncredited role as the shipyard worker who sings the opening song, and reprises it at the end.
 Alice Pearce was the only original member of the Broadway cast to reprise her role.

Musical numbers
 "I Feel Like I'm Not Out of Bed Yet" – Shipyard worker (from Leonard Bernstein's score)
 "New York, New York" – Gabey, Chip, and Ozzie (from Bernstein's score)
 "Miss Turnstiles Ballet" (instrumental) – Ivy and ensemble (from Bernstein's score)
 "Prehistoric Man" – Claire, Ozzie, Gabey, Chip, and Hildy
 "Come Up to My Place" – Hildy and Chip  (from Bernstein's score)
 "Main Street" – Gabey and Ivy
 "You're Awful" –  Chip and Hildy
 "On the Town" – Gabey, Ivy, Chip, Hildy, Ozzie, and Claire
 "You Can Count on Me" – Gabey, Chip, Ozzie, Hildy, Claire, and Lucy
 "A Day in New York" (instrumental) – Gabey, Ivy, and dream cast (from Bernstein's score)
 "I Feel Like I'm Not Out of Bed Yet"/"New York, New York" (reprise) – Shipyard worker, three sailors, and chorus

Source:

Production
The film had a budget of $1.5 million, one of Metro's lowest for a Technicolor musical, with a planned filming schedule of just 46 days.

The musical numbers staged on location in New York were the first time a major studio had accomplished this.  The location shots in New York took nine days. Shooting in New York City was Kelly and Donen's idea, which studio head Louis B. Mayer refused to allow, pointing out the studio's excellent New York sets in its backlot. Kelly and Donen held their ground, and finally Mayer relented and allowed a limited number of days shooting in New York. The primary problem experienced by the production was dealing with crowds of Frank Sinatra's fans, so some shots were made with the camera located in a station wagon to reduce the public visibility of the shooting.

The Breen Office of the MPAA refused to allow the use of the word "helluva" in the song "New York, New York", and so it was changed to "wonderful".

Reception

Box office
According to MGM records the film earned $2,934,000 in the US and Canada and $1,494,000 overseas, resulting in a profit to the studio of $474,000.

The film was also a critical success, receiving good reviews in various publications, including Variety and The New York Times.

Awards and honors
 Academy Awards, Best Musical Score for Roger Edens and Lennie Hayton, 22nd Academy Awards (won)
 BAFTA Awards, Best Film, 1951 (nominated)
 Golden Globes, Best Cinematography – Color, 1950 (nominated)
 Writers Guild of America, Best Written American Musical, 1950 (won)

American Film Institute
The film is recognized by American Film Institute in these lists:
 2004: AFI's 100 Years...100 Songs:
 "New York, New York" – #41
 2006: AFI's Greatest Movie Musicals – #19

See also
 Arthur Freed
 USS Nicholson, DD-442, the three sailors' ship, which appears in the opening and closing scenes

References

External links
 
 
 
 
 

1949 films
1949 musical films
American musical films
Films directed by Gene Kelly
Films directed by Stanley Donen
Films produced by Arthur Freed
Films scored by Leonard Bernstein
Films scored by Lennie Hayton
Films set in the 1940s
Films set in New York City
Films shot in New York City
Films that won the Best Original Score Academy Award
Films with screenplays by Betty Comden and Adolph Green
Metro-Goldwyn-Mayer films
Films based on musicals
Films about the United States Navy
United States National Film Registry films
1949 directorial debut films
1940s English-language films
1940s American films